Kiev class may refer to:

 (Project 1143 Krechyet) Soviet battlecruiser fixed-wing aircraft carrier class
 (Project 48) Soviet destroyer leader class cancelled due to WWII

See also

 Kiev (ship), ships named Kiev
 Kiev (disambiguation)